Baron Étienne Cerexhe (18 April 193124 June 2020) was a Belgian judge and academic. He was a member of the Belgian Senate from 1985 to 1987, and the Chamber of Representatives from 1988 to 1991. In 2009, Cerexhe was knighted by King Albert II.

Personal life and death

Cerexhe was born on 18 April 1931 in Schaerbeek, Belgium. He had degrees from the Université catholique de Louvain and the University of Paris. Cerexhe had honorary doctorates from the University of Lisbon, University of Ouagadougou and University of Santiago. He was the father of Belgian politician and mayor of Woluwe-Saint-Pierre .

Cerexhe died on 24 June 2020 at the age of 89. His death was announced the following day, and his funeral was held on 30 June in Woluwe-Saint-Pierre.

Career

Academic career
In 1967, Cerexhe and Pierre Maon founded the Faculty of Law at the Université de Namur. From 1967 to 1988, Cerexhe was dean of the faculty. He was also a lecturer at the Université catholique de Louvain. In 1974, he was a co-founder of the Faculty of Law (also known as the École Supérieure de Droit de Ouagadougou) at the University of Ouagadougou in Burkina Faso. In 1984, he helped set up the Centre for European Policy Studies in Brussels.

Political career

From 1988 to 1991, he sat in the Chamber of Representatives, representing the Christian Social Party (PSC). During his time, Cerexhe proposed a bill on constitutional reform that supported , a concept in use in Germany. This was later a part of Belgium's wider 1993 constitutional reforms. He was supportive of the Lomé Convention, and believed that it did not contribute to African poverty. Cerexhe was involved in providing humanitarian aid. He was a supporter of equality and recognition for all of Belgium's federal communities and regions.

In 1993, Cerexhe became a judge in the Court of Arbitration (now called the Constitutional Court), as one of their French language judges. He specialised in public, European and civil law. In April 2001, he retired and was given the title of judge emeritus. He was also made an honorary consul of the Wallonia region to Burkina Faso. Cerexhe was also president of the Belgian section of the Institut international de Droit d'Expression et d'inspiration Françaises.

Honours

In 2009, Cerexhe was knighted by King Albert II. He was given the title of baron.

Works

 Cerexhe, Étienne, Tourisme et intégration européenne (Tourism and European integration), 1985
 Cerexhe, Étienne, Snyers, Anne-Marie, Le droit européen : les objectifs et les institutions (European law: objectives and institutions), 1989

References

1931 births
2020 deaths
Barons of Belgium
Centre démocrate humaniste politicians
20th-century Belgian judges
People from Schaerbeek
Belgian nobility
University of Paris alumni
Université catholique de Louvain alumni
Academic staff of the Université de Namur
Academic staff of the University of Ouagadougou
Belgian expatriates in France